Fort Norfolk was a minor fortification built at Turkey Point (now Norfolk County, Ontario, Canada) during the War of 1812 to defend the southwestern end of Upper Canada.  It is a National Historic Site of Canada.

A redebout with single blockhouse structure surrounded by log palisades was built on the bluffs was built by the 37th Regiment of Foot during the winter of 1814-1815 to house several hundred soldiers. A larger fort and ship building facility was planned, but it was never built. The existence of the facility diminished and abandoned shortly after the War of 1812. A memorial cairn was added in 1922 to mark the site.

References

Buildings and structures in Norfolk County, Ontario
Norfolk
Norfolk
National Historic Sites in Ontario
History of Norfolk County, Ontario